Artagiin Narmandakh (born 8 March 1997) is a Mongolian footballer who plays as a midfielder for Mongolian Premier League club Ulaanbaatar City and the Mongolian national team.

International career
Narmandakh made his senior international debut on 2 September 2018 in a 2019 EAFF E-1 Football Championship match against Macau.

International goals
Score and result list Mongolia's goal tally first.

International career statistics

References

External links
MFF profile
National Football Teams profile

1997 births
Living people
Mongolian footballers
Association football defenders
Ulaanbaatar City FC players
Mongolia international footballers
Mongolian National Premier League players